Eugène Séguy (21 April 1890 – 1 June 1985) was a French entomologist and artist who specialised in Diptera. He held a chair of entomology at the Muséum national d'histoire naturelle in Paris from 1956 to 1960. He is also known for establishing the Diptera section at that museum. This entomologist is often confused with a French artist with a similar name: Émile-Allain Séguy (1877–1951). The latter is known for his pochoir artworks representing plants.

Work

  (Collection of biological and systematic studies on Diptera of the World). 11 vols. Text figs. (1924–1953).
 Faune de France. : Ptychopteridae à Phlebotominae 109 p.,179 figs (1925).
 . . Stratiomyidae to Omphralidae 308 p.,685 figs (1926).
 . . Asilidae 308 p.,685 figs 190 p.,384 figs (1927).
  [Marzo-Luglio 1931]. . Ann. Mus. civ. Stor. nat. Genova 55[1930–1931]: 490–511, figures 1–3 (1932). 
 . Voyage de M.M. Lesne [1928–1929] 13e note. Diptères [2e partie]. Mems. Estud. Mus. zool. Univ. Coimbra 67: 5–80 (1933). 
 . Rev. Soc. ent. Argent. 6: 9–16, 3 figures (1934). 
 Séguy, E. . ; Ed.: Jeannel. Mus. Natn. Hist. nat. 8: 319–380 (1938). 
 Séguy, E., 1938 ; Delagrave.
 .  684 p.,957 fig (1944).
 . pp. 609. 7 col + 3 b/w plates, 225 text figs. (1950).
 . Editions P. Lechevalier, Paris (FR)(1967).

References
 , Neuchâtel.

External links
 
Les mouches, Planches d'Eugène Séguy Muséum d'histoire naturelle, Neuchâtel
 New York Public Library Digital Collections archived prints

1890 births
1985 deaths
French entomologists
Dipterists
National Museum of Natural History (France) people
20th-century French zoologists